Danilo Alessandro (born 3 August 1988) is an Italian professional footballer who plays as a forward for Serie D club Cynthialbalonga.

Career
Born in Rome, Lazio, Alessandro started his career at Eccellenza Lazio (Italian sixth level until 2014) club Mentana Jenne, based in Jenne, in the Province of Rome. In January 2009 he was signed by Lega Pro Prima Divisione (Italian third level) club A.C. Cesena. The club finished as the champion of Group A of 2008–09 Lega Pro Prima Divisione and runner-up in 2009 Supercoppa di Lega di Prima Divisione.

In 2009, he left professional football for Voghera. He scored 22 goals in 2009–10 Serie D (Italian fifth division until 2014).

On 1 July 2010 he was signed by Serie B club Grosseto. He made 27 appearances in his maiden season in the second division, as no.88. He wore no.23 shirt in 2011–12 Serie B, which he only played 9 times.

On 13 January 2012 he was signed by Taranto of the third division. The club folded in 2012 due to financial difficulties. A new entity was admitted to 2012–13 Serie D. However Alessandro returned to Voghera instead of remained in Taranto.

In 2013 Alessandro joined Real Vicenza. He scored a goal in pre-season friendly on 3 August. On 5 August 2013 the club was admitted from 2013–14 Serie D to 2013–14 Lega Pro Seconda Divisione, to fill 1 of 7 vacancies, despite at the end of season also saw the merger of the two divisions of Lega Pro, which 18 teams instead of 9 teams would be relegated. Real Vicenza qualified for 2014–15 season as the 7th of Group A. Alessandro also scored 19 goals as team topscorer as well as joint-second topscorer of the fourth division along with Roberto Floriano (Group A) and Francesco Ripa (Group B)

On 27 July 2019, he joined Campobasso.

References

External links
 Lega Serie B profile 
 
 

Italian footballers
A.C. Cesena players
F.C. Grosseto S.S.D. players
Taranto F.C. 1927 players
Virtus Francavilla Calcio players
U.S. 1913 Seregno Calcio players
Serie B players
Serie C players
Serie D players
Association football forwards
Footballers from Rome
1988 births
Living people